Charlemagne Ischir Defontenay, writing as C.I. Defontenay (1819–1856), was a French science fiction writer. His Star, ou Psi Cassiopea of 1854 is seen by some as an example of proto-space opera. Others see Defontenay as a predecessor of Olaf Stapledon. Star describes the discovery in the Himalayas of a stone that has fallen from the sky. After opening it, it turns out to contain a metal box where the narrator finds some paper manuscripts. After two years of study, he managed to decipher them and finds out that they describe the alien societies of various humanoid races living in the constellation of Cassiopeia. One set of creatures were 9-foot tall blue-haired immortal humanoids.

Defontenay's other accomplishments included being a pioneer in plastic surgery. He was a disciple of Fourier and Hoffman. His writings often display his philosophical kinship with those thinkers.

References and links 
The Encyclopedia of Science Fiction
Publishers picture and brief information on the book
Project MUSE, restricted Access
Science Fiction studies article

References 

French science fiction writers
French plastic surgeons
1814 births
1856 deaths
19th-century French novelists
French male novelists
19th-century French male writers